Norman Thomas (born 14 March 1894, date of death unknown) was an Australian politician.

He was born at Byrock to grazier Charles Edward Thomas and Mary Jane, née Patterson. He attended public schools at Narromine, Parramatta and Kensington before studying at Stott and Hoare's Business College. He worked various jobs including a jackeroo at Trangie, a station overseer at Walgett, and a sheep farmer. From 1916 to 1919 he served in the Australian Flying Corps as an air mechanic. On 8 March 1924 he married Josephine Fagan, with whom he had three daughters. Thomas moved to Bondi around 1930 as an investor and property owner. In 1932 he was elected to the New South Wales Legislative Assembly as the United Australia Party member for Bondi, serving until his defeat in 1941. He served in the Royal Australian Air Force from 1940 to 1945 as a flight lieutenant.

References

 

1894 births
Year of death unknown
United Australia Party members of the Parliament of New South Wales
Members of the New South Wales Legislative Assembly
Royal Australian Air Force officers
Royal Australian Air Force personnel of World War II